Castilló del Pla (Castelló del Pla in Ribagorçan) is a locality belonging to the municipality of Benabarre, in the province of Huesca, Aragon, Spain. 

Prehistoric sites have been found nearby.

Monuments 
 18th-century parish church.

References

La Franja
Ribagorza
Populated places in the Province of Huesca